Agenzia Nazionale per la Sicurezza delle Ferrovie (ANSF) (In English National Railways Safety Agency)) was an Italian government agency overseeing the safety of the country's rail system. Its head office was in Florence, within the complex of the Firenze Santa Maria Novella railway station.

On 30 November 2020 the agency was substituted by Agenzia nazionale per la sicurezza delle ferrovie e delle infrastrutture stradali e autostradali (ANSF) (In English National agency for railways and road and highway infrastructures safety)).

See also

 Agenzia Nazionale per la Sicurezza del Volo – Air accident investigation agency

References

External links
 Agenzia Nazionale per la Sicurezza delle Ferrovie
  Agenzia Nazionale per la Sicurezza delle Ferrovie

Rail accident investigators
Rail transport in Italy
Government of Italy